Viva (born Janet Susan Mary Hoffmann; August 23, 1938) is an American actress, writer and former Warhol superstar.

Life and career
Viva was born in Syracuse, New York, the daughter of Mary Alice (née McNicholas) and Wilfred Ernest Hoffmann. Hoffmann was the eldest of nine children born into a family of strict Roman Catholics. Her father was a prosperous attorney, and her parents were stalwart supporters of the Army–McCarthy hearings held to expose Communist government infiltration. The Hoffmann children were required to watch the televised proceedings. Raised in devout Catholicism, she considered becoming a nun.

Viva began her career in entertainment as a model and painter. She retired from both professions, claiming that she believed painting to be a dead medium, and describing her time as a model as "...a period of my life I would rather forget." She was given the name Viva by Andy Warhol before the release of her first film but later used her married last name (Auder). She appeared in several of Warhol's films and was a frequent guest at the Factory.

Viva's film career began in 1967, when she began filming Ciao! Manhattan, which was not completed until 1972. Viva approached Andy Warhol about being in one of his films, on the suggestion of her friend, actress Abigail Rosen McGrath. Warhol agreed but only on the condition that Viva take off her blouse for the role. Viva responded by adhering bandaids to her breasts and visiting Warhol at The Factory.

Viva appeared in many of Warhol's films. The first, Tub Girls, consists of Viva lying in a bathtub with various people of both sexes, including Brigid Berlin and Rosen McGrath. She appeared in Bike Boy, a film about a motorcyclist trying to find himself; and The Nude Restaurant, in which she played a waitress, opposite Taylor Mead.

By far, Viva's most controversial role was in Blue Movie (1969), a seminal film in the Golden Age of Porn that helped inaugurate the "porno chic" phenomenon in modern American culture. Viva starred opposite Louis Waldon. The film consists of improvised dialogue between Viva and Waldon about a multitude of topics, including the Vietnam War, President Richard Nixon, and various mundane tasks. These conversations are interrupted by the main event of the film, in which Viva and Waldon perform sexual acts in front of the camera. The film was seized by New York City Police for obscenity, and the theater manager, projectionist and ticket-seller at the New Andy Warhol Garrick Theatre arrested for possession of obscene materials.

Viva was on the phone with Andy Warhol when he was shot by Valerie Solanas in 1968. Following Solanas' attempt on Warhol's life, Viva developed a close, personal friendship with Warhol's mother, Julia Warhola. Returning from the hospital, however, Warhol accused Viva of utilizing his absence to spy on his work and his mother, creating a rift in a relationship that was never repaired. Viva never saw Mrs. Warhola again after that.

Viva's first starring role in a non-Warhol film was in Agnès Varda's Lions Love in 1969. The film features Viva in a ménage à trois with Gerome Ragni and James Rado. On November 1, 1968, Viva appeared on The Tonight Show on an evening that was guest-hosted by Woody Allen. Four years later Allen cast her in his 1972 film Play It Again, Sam in the role of Jennifer. Blake Gopnik points out in his book Warhol: A Life as Art that she had a bit role as happening/party hostess, standing in for Warhol who was recuperating in the hospital, in John Schlesinger's film Midnight Cowboy.

After she began making films for other directors she also began writing. Her first book, Superstar, was an insider's look at the Factory scene, a partly fictional autobiographical account of her time there. It was distinguished from other "tell-all" memoirs by virtue of her writing, which incorporated various stylistic effects, including the use of taped conversations. She also wrote for various publications, including The Village Voice and New York Woman. Viva incorporated the use of video tapes into her second book The Baby. These tapes were later released by her former husband, video artist Michel Auder, as Chronicles: Family Diary in three parts. She was the narrator for Carla Bley's 1971 experimental jazz composition Escalator over the Hill. Viva was one of the early pioneers in video art. During the 1970s Viva was a guest participant in Shirley Clarke's Teepee Video Space Troupe, which she formed in the early 1970s.

Personal life
With former husband Michel Auder, Viva made and kept film diaries which included the birth of her first daughter, Alexandra (Alex) Auder. She was briefly engaged to the actor Anthony Herrera. They had one child together, the actress Gaby Hoffmann. Though artistically successful, Viva was never very successful financially. In 1993, she was taken to housing court by the Chelsea Hotel, where she lived with her two daughters, for not paying her $920 a month rent for two years. Her daughter Gaby said “We lived in a classless society. We’d spend a summer at Gore Vidal’s house in Italy, but we were on and off welfare.” Viva wrote a book about her daughter titled Gaby at the Chelsea, a riff on Eloise at the Plaza, as yet unpublished. Viva lives in Palm Springs, California, where she paints landscapes.

Filmography 

The Nude Restaurant (1967) The Waitress
Bike Boy (October 1967) Girl on couch
Tub Girls (1967)
Lonesome Cowboys (1968) Ramona D'Alvarez
San Diego Surf (1968) Susan Hoffman
The Loves of Ondine (August 1968) Girl in Bed
Lions Love (1969) Viva
Blue Movie (1969) Girl in Bed
Sam's Song (1969) Girl with the Hourglass
Midnight Cowboy (1969) Gretel McAlbertson – The Party
Keeping Busy (1969)
Trapianto, consunzione e morte di Franco Brocani (1969)
Necropolis (1970) Countess Bathory (as Viva Auder)
Cleopatra (1970) Cleopatra
Play It Again, Sam (1972) Jennifer
Ciao! Manhattan (1972) Diana – Vogue editor
Cisco Pike (1972) Merna
New Old (1979)
Seduction of Patrick (short) (1979)
Flash Gordon (1980) Cytherian Girl
The State of Things (1982) Kate
Forbidden Zone (1982) Ex-Queen
Paris, Texas (1984) Woman on TV (as Viva Auder)
The Man Without a Face (1993) Mrs. Cooper
The Feature (as Viva Superstar) (2008)
News From Nowhere (2010) Viva

Books
 Superstar (1970)
 The Baby (1974)

References

Further reading

Articles
 Goldsmith, Barbara (April 29, 1968). "La Dolce Viva". New York Magazine. pp.  36-41.
 Thomas, Kevin (October 18, 1968). "'Nude Restaurant' at Cinematheque 16". Los Angeles Times. p.  72.
 Kleiner, Dick (Jan 27, 1971). "Exit, Janet Sue, Enter Viva". The Chillicothe Constitution-Tribune.
 Berlin, Gloria; Bruce, Bryan (December 1986). "The Superstar Story: Andy; Edie and Andy; The Chelsea Girls; Viva's Warhol Movies; Viva in Hollywood". CineAction. pp.  59-63.
 Kinney, Tulsa (August 8, 2002). "Via Warhol, Lingering Fame--but No Lasting Fortune" Los Angeles Times.

Books
 Partnow, Elaine, ed. (1980). The Quotable Woman, An Encyclopedia of Useful Quotations, Volume Two: 1900-the present. Los Angeles, CA: Pinnacle Books. p. 480.

External links

Interview with Viva by Guy Flatley
Interview With Viva by Todd Moe on North Country Public Radio
Bert Green Fine Art

1938 births
Actresses from California
Actresses from Palm Springs, California
American film actresses
20th-century American memoirists
Living people
Actresses from Syracuse, New York
American women memoirists
20th-century American actresses
21st-century American actresses
Writers from Syracuse, New York
20th-century American women writers
People associated with The Factory